Hydrogen astatide, also known as astatine hydride, astatane, astidohydrogen or hydroastatic acid, is a chemical compound with the chemical formula HAt, consisting of an astatine atom covalently bonded to a hydrogen atom. It thus is a hydrogen halide.

This chemical compound can dissolve in water to form hydroastatic acid, which exhibits properties very similar to the other five binary acids, and is in fact the strongest among them. However, it is limited in use due to its ready decomposition into elemental hydrogen and astatine, as well as the short half-life of the various isotopes of astatine. Because the atoms have a nearly equal electronegativity, and as the  ion has been observed, dissociation could easily result in the hydrogen carrying the negative charge. Thus, a hydrogen astatide sample can undergo the following reaction:

This results in elemental hydrogen gas and astatine precipitate. Further, a trend for hydrogen halides, or HX, is that enthalpy of formation becomes less negative, i.e., decreases in magnitude but increases in absolute terms, as the halide becomes larger. Whereas hydroiodic acid solutions are stable, the hydronium-astatide solution is clearly less stable than the water-hydrogen-astatine system. Finally, radiolysis from astatine nuclei could sever the H–At bonds.

Additionally, astatine has no stable isotopes. The most stable is astatine-210, which has a half-life of approximately 8.1 hours, making its chemical compounds especially difficult to work with, as the astatine will quickly decay into other elements.

Preparation
Hydrogen astatide can be produced by reacting astatine with hydrocarbons (such as ethane):

References

Hydrogen compounds
Astatine compounds
Nonmetal halides
Diatomic molecules
Hydrides
Mineral acids